Events from the year 1492 in Spain.

Incumbents
Monarch(s):
 the Catholic Monarchs: King Ferdinand II,  Queen Isabella I
 John III of Navarre, Catherine of Navarre

Events

The Fall Of Granada
End Of The Reconquista
Alhambra Decree Issued
Jewish Diaspora Of Spain
Columbus' First Voyage
 by Antonio de Nebrija, first grammar of a modern European language

See also

Spanish Inquisition
Exploration of North America

1492 in Spain
1490s in Spain